This article is about Chinese referees' judging results in FIFA competitions.

Men's

FIFA World Cup

Men's Olympic Football Tournament (U-23)

FIFA World Youth Championship

FIFA U-16 World Championship / FIFA U-17 World Cup

Youth Olympic Football Tournament (U-15)

FIFA Confederations Cup (defunct)

Women's

FIFA Women's World Cup

Women's Olympic Football Tournament

FIFA U-19 Women's World Championship / FIFA U-20 Women's World Cup

FIFA U-17 Women's World Cup

Girls' Youth Olympic Football Tournament (U-15) 

Chinese referees and umpires